Lusk Creek is a creek located in southeastern Illinois. It is a tributary of the Ohio River, which it joins at Golconda.

Lusk Creek flows through the Lusk Creek Canyon, which is perhaps the wildest place in Illinois. Only a single bridge crosses the creek. The watershed is almost entirely within the Shawnee National Forest, and includes the Lusk Creek Wilderness Area. The entire watershed is within Pope County.

The creek is named for Maj. James Lusk and the Lusk family that operated Lusk's Ferry near where the creek enters the Ohio River.

See also
List of Illinois rivers

References

External links
USGS Real Time Stream Flow, Lusk Creek
US Forest Service Lusk Creek Wilderness Area
Sierra Club Directions
Prairie Rivers Network
TopoQuest map of Lusk Creek

Rivers of Illinois
Tributaries of the Ohio River
Rivers of Pope County, Illinois